Ray "Windmill" White (born August 5, 1938) is an American former professional boxer best known for his unorthodox punches. He fought boxers like Jimmy Dupree and Mike Quarry.

History
White fought out of Ventura, California in the 1960s and 1970s. He was a  draw in the Los Angeles area, fighting multiple times at the Olympic Auditorium and winning the California State Light Heavyweight title. The tall and lanky White, with his unusual reach advantage, invented several unorthodox punches including the behind the back punch.  His popularity led to appearances on national television shows including The Tonight Show Starring Johnny Carson and The Merv Griffin Show. He retired in 1974 and despite a record of 41-14-5 and wins over name contenders of the era, 

White currently resides in Ventura County, California and is an instructor at The Ventura KO Academy, where he helps in the training of amateur  fighters. In the summer of 2011, White will be inducted into California Boxing Hall of Fame as well as inducted to the Ventura County Hall of Fame. He was ranked the 7th most awkward fighter of all time in The Ultimate Boxing Book of Lists by Bert Randolph Sugar and Teddy Atlas.

Professional boxing record

|-
|align="center" colspan=8|41 Wins (11 knockouts, 30 decisions), 14 Losses (2 knockouts, 12 decisions), 5 Draws 
|-
| align="center" style="border-style: none none solid solid; background: #e3e3e3"|Result
| align="center" style="border-style: none none solid solid; background: #e3e3e3"|Record
| align="center" style="border-style: none none solid solid; background: #e3e3e3"|Opponent
| align="center" style="border-style: none none solid solid; background: #e3e3e3"|Type
| align="center" style="border-style: none none solid solid; background: #e3e3e3"|Round
| align="center" style="border-style: none none solid solid; background: #e3e3e3"|Date
| align="center" style="border-style: none none solid solid; background: #e3e3e3"|Location
| align="center" style="border-style: none none solid solid; background: #e3e3e3"|Notes
|-align=center
|Win
|
|align=left| Randy Miller
|TKO
|9
|11/06/1974
|align=left| Sam Houston Coliseum, Houston, U.S.
|align=left|
|-
|Win
|
|align=left| Eddie Bailey
|PTS
|10
|29/04/1974
|align=left| Philadelphia Spectrum, Philadelphia, U.S.
|align=left|
|-
|Loss
|
|align=left| Jesse Burnett
|KO
|8
|15/03/1974
|align=left| San Diego Coliseum, San Diego, U.S.
|align=left|
|-
|Draw
|
|align=left| Eddie Bailey
|PTS
|8
|18/02/1974
|align=left| Philadelphia Spectrum, Philadelphia, U.S.
|align=left|
|-
|Win
|
|align=left| Faustino Perez
|TKO
|7
|22/01/1974
|align=left| El Paso County Coliseum, El Paso, Texas, U.S.
|align=left|
|-
|Win
|
|align=left| Charles Anderson Atlas
|PTS
|10
|10/12/1973
|align=left| Monroe, Louisiana, U.S.
|align=left|
|-
|Win
|
|align=left| Bobby Rascon
|PTS
|10
|10/11/1973
|align=left| Tucson Convention Center, Tucson, Arizona, U.S.
|align=left|
|-
|Draw
|
|align=left| Hildo Silva
|PTS
|8
|17/08/1973
|align=left| San Diego Coliseum, San Diego, U.S.
|align=left|
|-
|Win
|
|align=left| Koroseta Kid
|PTS
|10
|03/07/1973
|align=left| Honolulu Civic Auditorium, Honolulu, U.S.
|align=left|
|-
|Win
|
|align=left| Bobby Rascon
|UD
|10
|01/06/1973
|align=left| Tucson Convention Center, Tucson, Arizona, U.S.
|align=left|
|-
|Win
|
|align=left| Chuck Hamilton
|TKO
|8
|10/03/1973
|align=left| Santa Rosa, California, U.S.
|align=left|
|-
|Win
|
|align=left| Lino Rendon
|PTS
|10
|20/02/1973
|align=left| Bakersfield Civic Auditorium, Bakersfield, California, U.S.
|align=left|
|-
|Loss
|
|align=left| Mike Quarry
|UD
|12
|29/01/1973
|align=left| Anaheim Convention Center, Anaheim, California, U.S.
|align=left|
|-
|Win
|
|align=left| Charley Austin
|UD
|10
|18/12/1972
|align=left| Phoenix Riverside Ballroom, Phoenix, Arizona, U.S.
|align=left|
|-
|Win
|
|align=left| Bob Hazelton
|TKO
|8
|12/12/1972
|align=left| San Diego, U.S.
|align=left|
|-
|Win
|
|align=left| Orlando de la Fuentes
|UD
|12
|20/11/1972
|align=left| Valley Music Theater, Woodland Hills, California, U.S.
|align=left|
|-
|Win
|
|align=left| Frank Niblett
|UD
|10
|06/11/1972
|align=left| Phoenix Riverside Ballroom, Phoenix, Arizona, U.S.
|align=left|
|-
|Draw
|
|align=left| Rafael Gutierrez
|PTS
|12
|02/10/1972
|align=left| Valley Music Theater, Woodland Hills, California, U.S.
|align=left|
|-
|Loss
|
|align=left| Johnny Griffin
|UD
|10
|26/04/1972
|align=left| Cleveland Arena, Cleveland, Ohio, U.S.
|align=left|
|-
|Win
|
|align=left| Hill Chambers
|UD
|10
|08/04/1972
|align=left| Tucson Convention Center, Tucson, Arizona, U.S.
|align=left|
|-
|Win
|
|align=left| "Irish" Terry Lee
|SD
|12
|26/02/1972
|align=left| Long Beach Auditorium, Long Beach, California, U.S.
|align=left|
|-
|Win
|
|align=left| "Irish" Terry Lee
|SD
|12
|04/12/1971
|align=left| Long Beach Auditorium, Long Beach, California, U.S.
|align=left|
|-
|Win
|
|align=left| Hill Chambers
|UD
|10
|19/11/1971
|align=left| Long Beach Auditorium, Long Beach, California, U.S.
|align=left|
|-
|Win
|
|align=left| Amado Vasquez
|TKO
|10
|24/09/1971
|align=left| Anaheim Convention Center, Anaheim, California, U.S.
|align=left|
|-
|Loss
|
|align=left| Jimmy "The Cat" Dupree
|UD
|12
|03/07/1971
|align=left| Santa Monica Civic Auditorium, Santa Monica, California, U.S.
|align=left|
|-
|Loss
|
|align=left| Lonnie Bennett
|SD
|10
|19/06/1971
|align=left| Ventura County Fairgrounds, Ventura, California, U.S.
|align=left|
|-
|Win
|
|align=left| Steve Grant
|PTS
|10
|05/06/1971
|align=left| Santa Monica Civic Auditorium, Santa Monica, California, U.S.
|align=left|
|-
|Win
|
|align=left| Roger Rouse
|UD
|10
|22/05/1971
|align=left| Santa Monica Civic Auditorium, Santa Monica, California, U.S.
|align=left|
|-
|Win
|
|align=left| Chuck Hamilton
|UD
|12
|17/04/1971
|align=left| Valley Music Theater, Woodland Hills, California, U.S.
|align=left|
|-
|Win
|
|align=left| Chuck Hamilton
|TKO
|2
|20/03/1971
|align=left| Valley Music Theater, Woodland Hills, California, U.S.
|align=left|
|-
|Win
|
|align=left| Terry Lee
|UD
|10
|20/02/1971
|align=left| Valley Music Theater, Woodland Hills, California, U.S.
|align=left|
|-
|Win
|
|align=left| "Big" Robie Harris
|SD
|10
|09/01/1971
|align=left| Valley Music Theater, Woodland Hills, California, U.S.
|align=left|
|-
|Draw
|
|align=left| Steve Grant
|PTS
|8
|21/11/1970
|align=left| Valley Music Theater, Woodland Hills, California, U.S.
|align=left|
|-
|Loss
|
|align=left| Steve Carter
|UD
|10
|10/08/1970
|align=left| Oakland Auditorium, Oakland, California, U.S.
|align=left|
|-
|Loss
|
|align=left| Hank Casey
|PTS
|10
|29/06/1970
|align=left| Oakland Auditorium, Oakland, California, U.S.
|align=left|
|-
|Win
|
|align=left| AJ Staples
|UD
|10
|01/05/1970
|align=left| Kiel Auditorium, Saint Louis, Missouri, U.S.
|align=left|
|-
|Loss
|
|align=left| Willis Earls
|PTS
|10
|30/03/1970
|align=left| Austin, Texas, U.S.
|align=left|
|-
|Win
|
|align=left| Frank Niblett
|UD
|10
|27/10/1969
|align=left| Valley Music Theater, Woodland Hills, California, U.S.
|align=left|
|-
|Win
|
|align=left| Rocky Martin
|TKO
|8
|26/08/1969
|align=left| Valley Music Theater, Woodland Hills, California, U.S.
|align=left|
|-
|Win
|
|align=left| Steve Grant
|SD
|10
|01/07/1969
|align=left| Valley Music Theater, Woodland Hills, California, U.S.
|align=left|
|-
|Win
|
|align=left| Lino Rendon
|PTS
|10
|04/12/1968
|align=left| Ventura County Fairgrounds, Ventura, California, U.S.
|align=left|
|-
|Win
|
|align=left| Sonny Moore
|UD
|10
|27/08/1968
|align=left| San Antonio Municipal Auditorium, San Antonio, U.S.
|align=left|
|-
|Win
|
|align=left| Gary Bates
|PTS
|6
|17/07/1968
|align=left| Silver Slipper, Las Vegas, Nevada, U.S.
|align=left|
|-
|Win
|
|align=left| Dick Gosha
|PTS
|10
|06/07/1968
|align=left| Ventura County Fairgrounds, Ventura, California, U.S.
|align=left|
|-
|Win
|
|align=left| Willis Earls
|KO
|2
|11/04/1968
|align=left| Sports Palace, Beaumont, Texas, U.S.
|align=left|
|-
|Loss
|
|align=left| George Johnson
|UD
|10
|28/11/1967
|align=left| Community Concourse, San Diego, U.S.
|align=left|
|-
|Loss
|
|align=left| Sam Wyatt
|PTS
|6
|09/10/1967
|align=left| Long Beach Municipal Auditorium, Long Beach, California, U.S.
|align=left|
|-
|Win
|
|align=left| Mark White
|KO
|2
|27/07/1967
|align=left| Olympic Auditorium, Los Angeles, U.S.
|align=left|
|-
|Draw
|
|align=left| Roy Wallace
|PTS
|6
|04/05/1967
|align=left| Olympic Auditorium, Los Angeles, U.S.
|align=left|
|-
|Win
|
|align=left| Mark White
|UD
|6
|06/04/1967
|align=left| Olympic Auditorium, Los Angeles, U.S.
|align=left|
|-
|Loss
|
|align=left| Mark White
|PTS
|4
|23/03/1967
|align=left| Olympic Auditorium, Los Angeles, U.S.
|align=left|
|-
|Win
|
|align=left| Gene Turner
|PTS
|4
|16/02/1967
|align=left| Olympic Auditorium, Los Angeles, U.S.
|align=left|
|-
|Win
|
|align=left| Frank Davis
|PTS
|4
|02/02/1967
|align=left| Olympic Auditorium, Los Angeles, U.S.
|align=left|
|-
|Win
|
|align=left| Buddy Levine
|TKO
|4
|03/11/1966
|align=left| Seattle Center Coliseum, Seattle, U.S.
|align=left|
|-
|Win
|
|align=left|Lavern Hardison
|KO
|4
|09/05/1966
|align=left| Hacienda Hotel, Las Vegas, Nevada, U.S.
|align=left|
|-
|Win
|
|align=left| Scott Wisooker
|PTS
|5
|28/03/1966
|align=left| Las Vegas, Nevada, U.S.
|align=left|
|-
|Loss
|
|align=left| Archie Ray
|KO
|3
|15/01/1966
|align=left| Phoenix, Arizona, U.S.
|align=left|
|-
|Loss
|
|align=left| Aaron Peralta
|PTS
|4
|30/03/1962
|align=left| Los Angeles Sports Arena, Los Angeles, U.S.
|align=left|
|-
|Win
|
|align=left| Dewayne Garris
|PTS
|4
|10/07/1959
|align=left| Monroe, Louisiana, U.S.
|align=left|
|-
|Loss
|
|align=left| Bill DeSoto
|PTS
|4
|12/12/1958
|align=left| Monroe, Louisiana, U.S.
|align=left|
|}

References

External links
 Ventura KO Boxing Club
 

1938 births
Light-heavyweight boxers
Living people
American male boxers
Boxers from California